Allan Blaer (born 1942) is a physicist, Professor Emeritus and Special Lecturer at Columbia University in New York City. He received his undergraduate degree from Columbia University in 1964, where he was the valedictorian. He later went on to obtain his PhD in physics at the same institution. He has done research in both theoretical and experimental physics. In quantum field theory, he worked on phase transitions in low-temperature bosonic and fermionic systems, quantum field theory anomalies, dyons and magnetic monopoles in non-abelian gauge theories, and renormalization theory. In experimental physics, he has worked on precision measurement of vacuum polarization in muonic atoms to test quantum electrodynamics.

Blaer was the director of undergraduate studies until 2008. Alongside a group of physics majors, Blaer established the Columbia University Chapter of the Society of Physics Students in November 1980. Until 2016, he ran the highly selective Columbia University Science Honors Program.

Blaer has also earned a reputation for being an excellent teacher of physics, particularly for his graduate classical electrodynamics course at Columbia, for which he has taught for decades.

Publications

 
 
 
 "Study of the Polarization Dependence of the Photoelectric Effect in the Soft X-Ray Band: A Focal Plane Photoelectric Stellar X-Ray Polarimeter for the SPECTRUM-X-Gamma Mission" (with A. Heckler, P. Kaaret and R. Novick) SPIE X-Ray/EUV Optics for Astronomy and Microscopy 1160, 580 (1989)

External links
- Allan Blaer's Homepage

21st-century American physicists
Columbia College (New York) alumni
Columbia University faculty
Living people
1942 births